Granuloma annulare in HIV disease is a skin condition characterized typically by papular and generalized skin lesions.

See also 
 Granuloma annulare
 Skin lesion

References 

Monocyte- and macrophage-related cutaneous conditions